2-Methyl-2-nitrosopropane (MNP or t-nitrosobutane) is the organic compound with the formula (CH3)3CNO.  It is a blue liquid that is used in chemical research as a spin trap, i.e. it binds to radicals.

Preparation and structure
t-BuNO is prepared by the following sequence:
(CH3)3CNH2 → (CH3)3CNO2
(CH3)3CNO2 → (CH3)3CNHOH
(CH3)3CNHOH → (CH3)3CNO

The freshly distilled compound is a blue volatile liquid.  Like other nitroso compounds, it features a bent C-N=O linkage.  Upon standing at room temperature, the blue liquid converts to the colourless solid that is the dimer (m.p. 74-75 °C).  In solution, this dimer quickly reverts to the blue monomer.

Reactions
It can be used as a spin trap.  This molecule traps unstable free radicals to form stable paramagnetic nitroxide radicals that can be detected and analyzed by electron spin resonance spectroscopy. It is particularly useful for trapping carbon-centered tyrosyl radicals. It has also been used in organic chemistry as electrophile to transform sulfones into aldehydes.

MNP is also an efficient regulator of the radical polymerization of methyl methacrylate through the 'pseudoliving' chain mechanism.

See also
 Nitroso

References

Nitroso compounds
Tert-butyl compounds